The 1978–79 Indiana Hoosiers men's basketball team represented Indiana University. Their head coach was Bobby Knight, who was in his 8th year. The team played its home games in Assembly Hall in Bloomington, Indiana, and was a member of the Big Ten Conference.

The Hoosiers finished the regular season with an overall record of 22–12 and a conference record of 10–8, finishing 5th in the Big Ten Conference. Coming off an NCAA Tournament Sweet Sixteen appearance, Indiana missed out on an invitation to the 1979 NCAA Tournament. Instead, IU was invited to participate in the 1979 NIT, where Bobby Knight and the Hoosiers advanced to the championship game and won their first NIT title.

Roster

Schedule/Results

|-
!colspan=8| Regular Season
|-

|-
!colspan=8| NIT

Notes
During the NIT, Indiana and Ohio State both received byes during the quarterfinals and advanced directly to the semifinals.

Awards and honors
 Butch Carter, NIT co-Most Valuable Player
 Ray Tolbert, NIT co-Most Valuable Player

References

Indiana Hoosiers men's basketball seasons
Indiana
Indiana
National Invitation Tournament championship seasons
Indiana Hoosiers
Indiana Hoosiers